SS Flying Eagle may refer to the following ships:

 , a Type C2-S-AJ1 ship; renamed Del Alba in 1946; broken up in 1970
 , a Type C2-S-AJ3 ship; the former  USS Venango (AKA-82); named Flying Eagle from 1952 to 1968; broken up in 1971 in Spain

Ship names